The 23rd People's Choice Awards, honoring the best in popular culture for 1996, were held on January 12, 1997, at the Pasadena Civic Auditorium in Pasadena, California. They were hosted by Don Johnson and Roma Downey, and broadcast on CBS.

The theme music is used for the pounding dance beats heard.

Rob Reiner received a special award for his work in the motion picture and television industry.

Awards
Winners are listed first, in bold.

External links
1997 People's Choice.com

People's Choice Awards
1997 awards in the United States
1997 in California
January 1997 events in the United States